Donald S. Rudd (born June 13, 1950) is a Canadian curler.

He started curling in 1960 when he was 10 years old.

In 2005 he was inducted in the Manitoba Curling Association Hall of Fame with all of the 1992 and 1993 Vic Peters' champions team.

Teams

References

External links
 
 Don Rudd – Curling Canada Stats Archive

Living people
1950 births
Brier champions
People from Morden, Manitoba
Canadian male curlers
Curlers from Winnipeg